Jonas Björkman and Todd Woodbridge were the defending champions, but lost in the first round this year.

Leander Paes and David Rikl won in the final 6–2, 7–5, against Tomáš Cibulec and Petr Pála.

Seeds

Draw

Draw

External links
Draw

2004 Gerry Weber Open